Unplugged is a 2004 live album by Bachata group Aventura exclusively to Europe. This album is a re-release version of the album En Vivo (Live) released in 2002, which isn't really mentioned much. In 2011 it was re-released as LIVE! 2002 which was available everywhere and has the same 8 live tracks and included a bonus track from the 9th Annual Latin Grammy Awards in which Aventura paid homage to José José with the song Lágrimas (Tears). Even though this performance happened in 2008, it was still added as a bonus track for the 2011 version of the live album.

Track listing

Charts

References

External links
Aventura official site

Aventura (band) live albums
2004 live albums
Spanish-language live albums